FC Chernomorets is a Bulgarian football club based in Byala, Varna Province, currently playing in the Bulgarian V AFG, the third division of Bulgarian football. Club colors are blue, white and yellow. The club was officially founded in 1945.

Stadium

Its home stadium Chernomorets has a capacity of 700 seats. Built in 1986, the ground underwent a reconstruction in 2006.

External links 
 Chernomorets Byala at bgclubs.eu

Chernomorets Byala
Association football clubs established in 1945
1945 establishments in Bulgaria